Lužnice is a settlement in the Aerodrom municipality of the city of Kragujevac in central Serbia. The population numbers at 981 (2011 census), down from 1064 (2003 census).

References

Populated places in Šumadija District
Kragujevac